Richard Kiplagat (born 3 May 1984) is a Kenyan former athlete who specialised in middle-distance running.

Kiplagat, who comes from Eldoret, competed mainly as a 800 metres runner. In 2008 he competed at the IAAF World Indoor Championships in Valencia, where he was disqualified for running outside of his lane. He qualified for the 2008 IAAF World Athletics Final in Stuttgart and came seventh in the 800 metres race. In 2010 he won a silver medal in the 800 metres at the Commonwealth Games in Delhi, with Kenya sweeping the podium for the first time in the event.

References

External links
Richard Kiplagat at World Athletics

1984 births
Living people
Kenyan male middle-distance runners
Commonwealth Games silver medallists for Kenya
Commonwealth Games medallists in athletics
Medallists at the 2010 Commonwealth Games
Athletes (track and field) at the 2010 Commonwealth Games
Athletes (track and field) at the 2007 All-Africa Games
African Games competitors for Kenya
People from Rift Valley Province